A landlord is the owner of a house, apartment, condominium, land, or real estate which is rented or leased to an individual or business.

Landlord or variants may also refer to:

Film
 Der Herr im Haus or The Landlord, a 1940 film
 The Landlord, a 1970 film
 The Landlord (2007 film), a comedy film

Music
 Landlord (album)
 The Landlords, an American hardcore punk band

Other uses
 Landlord (beer), a brand of English ale brewed by Timothy Taylor Brewery
 Pub landlord, a manager of a UK pub
 The Landlord, a 1966 novel by Kristin Hunter

See also 
 Dou dizhu or Fight the Landlord, a card game
 The Landlady (disambiguation)
 The Pub Landlord, a comic character played by Al Murray